Vain may refer to:

 Vain (horse) (1966–1991), a champion Australian Thoroughbred racehorse
 Vain Stakes, an Australian Thoroughbred horse race
 Vain (band), a glam metal band formed in the San Francisco Bay Area in 1986
 Vaginal intraepithelial neoplasia (VAIN), a medical disorder
 Vain, a strange creature who plays an important part in The Chronicles of Thomas Covenant by Stephen Donaldson
 Vain., taxonomic author abbreviation for Edvard August Vainio (1853–1929), Finnish lichenologist
 Vanity Vain, Swedish drag queen

See also
 Vanity
 Vane (disambiguation)